Gric may refer to:

 Grič (disambiguation), a South Slavic toponym
 GRIC, the Gila River Indian Community in Arizona, United States